The Cerralbo Museum (Spanish: Museo Cerralbo) is a State-owned museum located in Madrid, Spain. It houses the art and historical object collections of Enrique de Aguilera y Gamboa, Marquis of Cerralbo, who died in 1922.

History 

Enrique de Aguilera y Gamboa, the Marquis of Cerralbo, opened the place as private gallery in 1893.

After the Spanish State accepted to inherit the collection in 1924, the building opened to students and researchers. The Marquis' collection was split, with a part moved to the National Archaeological Museum and the rest remaining at the building, which was constituted as a proper museum in 1944.

The building was built in the 19th century, according to Italian taste, and it was luxuriously decorated with baroque furniture, wall paintings and expensive chandeliers. It retains to a large extent its original aesthetics.

The building was protected as historical-artistic monument in 1962.

Collection 
With more than 24,900 pieces, the original collection featured a large numismatics collection. The archaeology collection originally included the Greek, Roman, Etruscan and Egyptian pieces characteristic of 19th collectors, as well as items from the Iberian Peninsula (Neolithic, Iberian, Roman, Almohad) and two stone masks from Puerto Rico. The museum hosts a collection of Oriental art items, chiefly Chinese art and Japanese art.

The exhibited objects consists of items from the personal collections of the Marquis of Cerralbo and the Marquise of Villa-Huerta.

Paintings 
The Marquis showed a preference for Spanish and Italian works and religious and portrait paintings.
Painting works include works by Jacopo Tintoretto, Jacopo Palma the Younger, El Greco, Ludovico Carracci, Alonso Cano, Zurbarán and Luis Paret.

Gallery

Archaeology 
The bulk of the archaeology section consists of the Marquis' numismatics collection.

Decorative arts 
The decorative arts section features porcelain pieces, pottery, tapestries, carpets, furniture, lamps and jewellery.

Clocks 
The museum also hosts a collection of 18th and 19th-century French and English clocks.

References 
Citations

Bibliography

See also
List of museums in Madrid

External links
 Official website 
Cerralbo Museum within Google Arts & Culture

Museums in Madrid
Cerralbo
Cerralbo
Cerralbo
Museums established in 1944
1944 establishments in Spain
Bien de Interés Cultural landmarks in Madrid
Buildings and structures in Argüelles neighborhood, Madrid